William Watson was a Scottish  footballer who played as a left back for Bradford City between 1920 and 1931, making 330 league appearances.

References

Scottish footballers
Bradford City A.F.C. players
Airdrieonians F.C. (1878) players
Walsall F.C. players
English Football League players
Scottish Football League players
Year of birth missing
1950 deaths
Date of death missing
Association football defenders
Sportspeople from Larkhall
Footballers from South Lanarkshire